Sir Anthony Alfred Caro  (8 March 192423 October 2013) was an English abstract sculptor whose work is characterised by assemblages of metal using 'found' industrial objects. His style was of the modernist school, having worked with Henry Moore early in his career. He was lauded as the greatest British sculptor of his generation.

Early life and education
Caro was born in New Malden, England to a Jewish family and was the youngest of three children. When Caro was three, his father, a stockbroker, moved the family to a farm in Churt, Surrey. Caro was educated at Charterhouse School where his housemaster introduced him to Charles Wheeler. In the holidays he studied at the Farnham School of Art (now the University for the Creative Arts) worked in Wheeler's studio. He later earned a degree in engineering at Christ's College, Cambridge. In 1946, after time in the Royal Navy, he studied sculpture at the Regent Street Polytechnic before pursuing further studies at the Royal Academy Schools from 1947 until 1952.

Work

Anthony Caro encountered modernism when working as an assistant to Henry Moore in the 1950s. After being introduced to the American sculptor David Smith in the early 1960s, he abandoned his earlier figurative work and started constructing sculptures by welding or bolting together pieces of steel such as I-beams, steel plates and meshes. Twenty Four Hours (1960), in Tate Britain since 1975, is one of his earliest abstract sculptures in painted steel. Often the finished piece was then painted in a bold flat colour.

Caro found international success in the late 1950s. He is often credited with the significant innovation of removing the sculpture from its plinth, although Smith and Brâncuși had both previously taken steps in the same direction. Caro's sculptures are usually self-supporting and sit directly on the floor. In doing so, they remove a barrier between the work and the viewer, who is invited to approach and interact with the sculpture from all sides.

In 1980 Caro was trying to organise an exhibition of British abstract art in South African townships when he met Robert Loder. In 1981, when staying in New York State, the pair developed the idea of running workshops for professional artists, which became the Triangle Arts Trust. They held the first Triangle workshop in 1982 for thirty sculptors and painters from the US, the UK and Canada at Pine Plains, New York.

In the 1980s Caro's work changed direction with the introduction of more literal elements, with a series of figures drawn from classical Greece. Latterly he has attempted large scale installation pieces, one of which, Sea Music, stands on the quay at Poole, Dorset.

In the early 2000s, his work featured nearly life-size equestrian figures built from fragments of wood and terra cotta on gymnast's vaulting horses. In 2008, Caro opened his "Chapel of Light" installation in the Saint Jean-Baptiste Church of Bourbourg (France), and exhibited four figurative head sculptures at the National Portrait Gallery, London. In 2011 the Metropolitan Museum of Art installed five works by Caro on their rooftop. As of 2012, Caro was working on an immense, multipart sculpture that would occupy three blocks of Midtown Park Avenue.

Teaching

Caro was also a tutor at Saint Martin's School of Art in London, inspiring a younger generation of British abstract sculptors, led by former students and assistants including Phillip King, Tim Scott, William G. Tucker, Peter Hide, and Richard Deacon; as well as a reaction group including Bruce McLean, Barry Flanagan, Richard Long, Jan Dibbets, David Hall and Gilbert & George. He and several former students were asked to join the seminal 1966 show at the Jewish Museum in New York entitled, Primary Structures representing the British influence on the "New Art". Caro taught at Bennington College from 1963 to 1965, along with painter Jules Olitski and sculptor David Smith.

Architecture and design
Caro also collaborated with celebrated architects, notably Frank Gehry, with whom he constructed a wooden village New York in 1987. With Norman Foster and the engineer Chris Wise, he designed the London Millennium Footbridge spanning the Thames between St. Paul's Cathedral and the Tate Modern.

Exhibitions

Since the 1950s, Caro's work has been shown museums and galleries worldwide.

His first solo exhibition was at the Galleria del Naviglio in Milan in 1956, and his first solo show in London was at the Gimpel Fils Gallery the next year. Another solo show was at the Whitechapel Art Gallery in 1963. In 1967 Caro began exhibiting regularly with Kasmin in London, and in 1969, he began showing with André Emmerich in New York. In the same year he showed at the São Paulo Biennale with John Hoyland. In 2004, to honour his 80th birthday, Tate Britain and other galleries held exhibitions of his work.

Caro's museum exhibitions include "Anthony Caro: A Retrospective" at the Museum of Modern Art, New York (1975, travelled to Walker Art Center, Minneapolis, Museum of Fine Arts, Houston, and Museum of Fine Arts, Boston); "Anthony Caro", Museum of Contemporary Art, Tokyo (1995); "Anthony Caro", Tate Britain, London (2005); three museums in Pas-de-Calais, France (2008), to accompany the opening of his Chapel of Light at Bourbourg; and "Anthony Caro on the Roof", Metropolitan Museum of Art, New York (2011). In 2012 the Yale Center for British Art presented "Caro: Close Up".

From 1 June to 27 October 2013 in connection with the 55th Venice Biennale, he exhibited at the Museo Correr, Venice, Italy. The exhibit was on at the time of his death.

Recognition
Caro was appointed Commander of the Order of the British Empire (CBE) in the 1969 New Year Honours. He was knighted in the 1987 Birthday Honours and received the Order of Merit in May 2000. He was awarded many prizes, including the Praemium Imperiale for Sculpture in Tokyo in 1992 and the Lifetime Achievement Award for Sculpture in 1997.

Personal life
In 1949, Caro married the painter Sheila Girling  and they had two sons together: Timothy (born 1951), a zoologist; and Paul (born 1958, a painter.

Death
Caro was 89 when he died of a heart attack on 23 October 2013. He was lauded as a "gentle man with a pioneering spirit" by BBC arts editor Will Gompertz and "one of the greatest sculptors in the second half of the twentieth century" by Royal Academy of Arts chief executive Charles Saumarez Smith. He is buried in the churchyard of Worth Matravers, Dorset.

References

Further reading
 Barker, Ian, Anthony Caro: Quest for the New Sculpture (Aldershot: Lund Humphries, 2004) .
 Reid, Mary, Anthony Caro: Drawing in Space (Farnham: Lund Humphries, 2009) .
 Wilkin, Karen, Anthony Caro: Interior and Exterior (Farnham: Lund Humphries, 2009) .
 Julius Bryant, Julius, Anthony Caro: Figurative and Narrative Sculpture (Farnham: Lund Humphries, 2009) .
 Westley Smith, H.F., Anthony Caro: Small Sculptures (Farnham, Lund Humphries, 2010) .
 Moorhouse, Paul, Anthony Caro: Presence (Farnham, Lund Humphries, 2010) .
 Saunders, Wade, Anthony Caro Recent Sculptures (Baltimore, C. Grimaldis Gallery, 1987).
 Millard, Charles, Anthony Caro Works of the 1980s (Baltimore, C. Grimaldis Gallery, 1989).
 Payton, Neal, "Anthony Caro Sculpture: Towards Architecture, Recent Bronzes" (Baltimore, C. Grimaldis Gallery, 1994) ASIN B0006RO25G.
 Adams, Virginia K., "Anthony Caro A Survey" (Baltimore, C. Grimaldis Gallery, 2004) ASIN B003X59K3C.
  Anthony Caro in the National Gallery of Australia's Kenneth Tyler Collection

External links
 
 Discussion of Early One Morning by Janina Ramirez and Alastair Sooke: Art Detective Podcast, 04 Jan 2017

1924 births
2013 deaths
Academics of Saint Martin's School of Art
Alumni of Chelsea College of Arts
Alumni of Christ's College, Cambridge
Alumni of the University of Westminster
English male sculptors
Knights Bachelor
Modern sculptors
Members of the Order of Merit
People educated at Charterhouse School
Recipients of the Praemium Imperiale
Royal Academicians
English Sephardi Jews
20th-century British sculptors
English contemporary artists
Commanders of the Order of the British Empire
 
Fleet Air Arm personnel of World War II